The 2014–15 Robert Morris Colonials men's basketball team represented Robert Morris University during the 2014–15 NCAA Division I men's basketball season. The Colonials, led by fifth year head coach Andrew Toole, played their home games at the Charles L. Sewall Center and were members of the Northeast Conference. They finished the season 20–15, 12–6 in NEC play to finish in a tie for second place. They defeated Wagner, Bryant, and St. Francis Brooklyn to be champions of the NEC tournament. They received an automatic bid to the NCAA tournament where they defeated North Florida in the First Four before losing in the second round to Duke.

Roster

Schedule

|-
|-
!colspan=9 style="background:#14234B; color:white;"| Non-conference regular season

|-
!colspan=9 style="background:#14234B; color:white;"| NEC regular season

|-
!colspan=9 style="background:#14234B; color:white;"| Northeast Conference tournament

|-
!colspan=9 style="background:#14234B; color:white;"| NCAA tournament

References

Robert Morris Colonials men's basketball seasons
Robert Morris
Robert Morris
Robert
Robert